The 1879 Grand National was the 41st renewal of the Grand National horse race that took place at Aintree near Liverpool, England, on 28 March 1879.

Finishing Order

Non-finishers

References

 1879
Grand National
Grand National
19th century in Lancashire